Saphesia is a monotypic genus of flowering plants belonging to the family Aizoaceae. Its only species is Saphesia flaccida.

Its native range is within the Republic of South Africa.

References

Aizoaceae
Aizoaceae genera
Taxa named by N. E. Brown
Taxa named by Nikolaus Joseph von Jacquin
Monotypic Caryophyllales genera